The 2016 Munster Senior Hurling League was the inaugural staging of the Munster Senior Hurling League. The fixtures were announced on 4 December 2015. The league began on 3 January 2016 and ended on 23 January 2016.

On 23 January 2016, Clare won the league following an 0-18 to 0-17 defeat of Limerick in the final.	
	
Limerick's Declan Hannon was the league's top scorer with 1-21.

The league attracted almost 12,000 spectators in total, an average of 1,192 per match.

Format

Five of the six Munster teams compete in the league, with Tipperary opting not to participate. Unlike its predecessor, the Waterford Crystal Cup, the league is confined to inter-county teams only. This means that third level institutions are not permitted to take part.

Each team plays the other teams in its group once, earning 2 points for a win and 1 for a draw. Originally the top two teams were to play each other in the final, but as both Clare and Limerick won their first three games, it was decided that the last group game would double up as the Munster Senior Hurling League final.

Details

Table

Fixtures/results

Round 1

Round 2

Round 3

Round 4

Round 5

Final

League statistics

General

First goal of the championship:
David Reidy for Limerick against Kerry (3 January 2016)
Widest winning margin: 25 points
 Clare 2-27 – 0-8  Kerry (13 January 2016)
Most goals in a match:  4
 Waterford 1-17 – 3-16  Limerick (19 January 2016)
Most points in a match: 41
 Limerick 2-23 – 0-18  Kerry (3 January 2016)
Most goals by one team in a match: 3
 Limerick 3-16 - 1-17  Waterford (19 January 2016)
 Highest aggregate score: 47
 Limerick 2-23 – 0-18  Kerry (3 January 2016)
Lowest aggregate score:  31
 Clare 1-14 - 1-14  Cork (3 January 2016)
Most goals scored by a losing team: 1
 Waterford 1-9 – 1-20  Clare (17 January 2016)
 Waterford 1-17 – 3-16  Limerick (19 January 2016)

Scoring

Overall

Single game

Clean sheets

Miscellaneous

 Initially intended to be a final group game, with Limerick and Clare already through to the final of the competition it was decided to double this fixture up as the final. Both sides advanced having won each of their three group games.

References

External links
 2016 Munster Senior Hurling League fixtures

Munster Senior Hurling League
Munster Senior Hurling League